Carrington is an unincorporated community in Callaway County, in the U.S. state of Missouri. The community is on Missouri Route H approximately four miles west-southwest of Fulton. It is on the boundary of a section of the Mark Twain National Forest.

History
Carrington was laid out in 1872 by William Carrington, and named for him.  A post office called Carrington was established in 1873, and remained in operation until 1954.

References

Unincorporated communities in Callaway County, Missouri
Unincorporated communities in Missouri
Jefferson City metropolitan area